Lebanon is a city in and the county seat of Warren County, Ohio, United States. The population was 20,841 at the 2020 census. It is part of the Cincinnati metropolitan area.

History
Lebanon is in the Symmes Purchase. The first European settler in what is now Lebanon was Ichabod Corwin, uncle of Ohio Governor Thomas Corwin, who came to Ohio from Bourbon County, Kentucky, and settled on the north branch of Turtle Creek in March 1796. The site of his cabin is now on the grounds of Berry Intermediate School on North Broadway and is marked with a monument erected by the Warren County Historical Society.

The town was laid out in September 1802 on land owned by Ichabod Corwin, Silas Hurin, Ephraim Hathaway, and Samuel Manning in Sections 35 and 35 of Town 5, Range 3 North and Sections 5 and 6 of Town 4, Range 3 North of the Between the Miami Rivers Survey. Lebanon was named after the Biblical Lebanon because of the many juniper or Eastern Red cedar trees there, similar to the Lebanon Cedar. It is known today as "The Cedar City".

City legend has it that Lebanon didn't grow as large as Cincinnati or Dayton because of the 'Shaker Curse'. During their migration, the Shakers decided an area outside of town was a suitable place for them to create a homeland for themselves. There was a disagreement with some of the locals and it was said the Shakers placed a curse on the city to hinder the city's prosperity. A local man, Malchalm Worley was their first convert. Since the Shakers did not engage in procreation, they relied on converts to increase their numbers. By 1900, there were almost no Shakers left in Ohio.

The city is one of the few in the nation to once operate a government-run cable television and telephone service, as well as being a fiber-to-the-neighborhood Internet service provider. Controversial since it began operation in 1999, the Lebanon telecommunications system had struggled to recover its expenses and had accumulated over $8 million in debt. However, residents in the area at the time paid up to 50% less for the aforementioned services than neighboring communities, therefore saving over $40 million of the residents' money. In the 2006 general election, however, voters approved the sale of this city-run telecommunications system to Cincinnati Bell.

Geography

Demographics

2010 census
As of the census of 2010, there were 20,033 people, 7,436 households, and 5,213 families living in the city. The racial makeup of the city was 92.7% White, 2.6% African American, 0.2% Native American, 0.8% Asian, 1.6% from other races, and 2.0% from two or more races. Hispanic or Latino of any race were 3.5% of the population.

There were 7,436 households, of which 41.2% had children under the age of 18 living with them, 51.3% were married couples living together, 13.5% had a female householder with no husband present, 5.3% had a male householder with no wife present, and 29.9% were non-families. 24.4% of all households were made up of individuals, and 7.9% had someone living alone who was 65 years of age or older. The average household size was 2.62 and the average family size was 3.12.

The median age in the city was 34.7 years. 29.2% of residents were under the age of 18; 7.3% were between the ages of 18 and 24; 29.5% were from 25 to 44; 23.9% were from 45 to 64; and 10.1% were 65 years of age or older. The gender makeup of the city was 49.0% male and 51.0% female.

2000 census
As of the census of 2000, there were 16,962 people living in the city. The population density was 1,440.6 people per square mile (556.4/km2). There were 6,218 housing units at an average density of 528.1 per square mile (204.0/km2). The racial makeup of the city was 90.98% White, 6.36% African American, 0.32% Native American, 0.64% Asian, 0.02% Pacific Islander, 0.37% from other races, and 1.31% from two or more races. Hispanic or Latino of any race were 1.13% of the population.

There were 5,887 households, out of which 40.7% had children under the age of 18 living with them, 54.8% were married couples living together, 12.9% had a female householder with no husband present, and 28.5% were non-families. 24.3% of all households were made up of individuals, and 8.6% had someone living alone who was 65 years of age or older. The average household size was 2.58 and the average family size was 3.08.

In the city, the population was spread out, with 27.2% under the age of 18, 10.3% from 18 to 24, 36.8% from 25 to 44, 16.8% from 45 to 64, and 8.9% who were 65 years of age or older. The median age was 32 years. For every 100 females, there were 110.1 males. For every 100 females age 18 and over, there were 114.1 males.

The median income for a household in the city was $46,856, and the median income for a family was $52,578. Males had a median income of $40,361 versus $27,551 for females. The per capita income for the city was $20,897. About 4.7% of families and 6.4% of the population were below the poverty line, including 6.6% of those under age 18 and 6.3% of those aged 65 or over.

Economy
Prisons operated by the Ohio Department of Corrections in the area include Lebanon Correctional Institution and Warren Correctional Institution.

Arts and culture

Events
 Lebanon Blues Festival
 Lebanon Country Music Festival
 Warren County Fair
 Country Applefest
 Horse Drawn Carriage Parade and Christmas Festival
 Third Friday block party on Mulberry Street

Landmarks and attractions

The Golden Lamb Inn
The Golden Lamb Inn is located in Lebanon on the corner of S. Broadway and Main St. It is recognized as Ohio's oldest inn, having been established in 1803, and has been visited by 12 presidents.

Warren County Historical Society and Harmon Museum of Art and History
The Warren County Historical Museum is recognized as one of the nation's most outstanding county museums. It includes the Harmon Museum, housed in Harmon Hall, a three-story,  building with displays and exhibits of art and artifacts from prehistoric eras to the mid-20th century.

Glendower Historic Mansion
The Glendower Historic Mansion, owned by the Warren County Historical Society, was erected circa 1845. It provides a classic example of residential Greek Revival architecture and a natural setting for many elegant Empire and Victorian furnishings from Warren County's past.

Lebanon Mason Monroe Railroad
Lebanon is home to the Lebanon Mason Monroe Railroad, where passengers follow an old stage coach route passing meadow, pasture, a rippling creek and wildflowers along the way.

Countryside YMCA
The largest YMCA in the U.S. consists of: four basketball gyms, two weight rooms, five indoor pools, one outdoor pool, tennis courts, baseball fields, racquetball courts, preschool and daycare, gymnastics center, outdoor soccer fields, five aerobics rooms, senior citizen center, two waterparks (one inside, one outside), sports medicine center, rock climbing wall, two indoor tracks, outdoor track, acres of forest and trails, pond, outdoor playground, locker rooms, outdoor volleyball, and flag football fields.

Harmon Golf Club
Harmon Golf Club is a nine-hole, par 36 public golf course located on South East Street. It was built in 1912.

Education
Lebanon City Schools operates the following public schools:
 Bowman Primary School (K-2)
 Donovan Elementary School (3-4)
 Berry Intermediate School (5-6)
 Lebanon Junior High School (7-8)
 Lebanon High School (9-12)

The city is served by a lending library, the Lebanon Public Library.

Media

Print
 Today's Pulse (based in Liberty Township, Butler County)

Television
 Channel 6 - The Lebanon Channel City Cable
 Broadcast television from Cincinnati and Dayton markets

Infrastructure

Highways
 Interstate 71
 U.S. Route 42
 Ohio State Route 48
 Ohio State Route 63
 Ohio State Route 123
 Ohio State Route 741

Notable people

 Neil Armstrong, first man to walk on the moon; made his home in Lebanon for 23 years after the moon landing
 Cyrus Ball, judge
 Amos Booth, baseball player for Cincinnati Red Stockings 1876-77
 John Chivington, officer in American Civil War and Sand Creek Massacre
 Clay Clement, actor of 1930s films
 Thomas Corwin, Governor of Ohio from 1840 to 1842; U.S. Senator from 1845 to 1850
 Charles Cretors, invented the first popcorn machine in 1885
 Greg Demos, bass player for Guided by Voices
 Abby Franquemont, writer, revivalist of the art of hand spinning with a spindle
 George E. Gard, police chief of Los Angeles in 19th Century
 Scooter Gennett, MLB player for the Cincinnati Reds
 Woody Harrelson, (moved from Texas at age 12), film and TV actor, Emmy Award winner and three-time Academy Awards nominee
 Bruce Edwards Ivins, government scientist who committed suicide while under investigation for 2001 anthrax attacks
 Jill Jones, singer, songwriter, and actress
 Maldwyn Jones, motorcycle racer, American Motorcyclist Association Hall of Fame Inductee in 1998
 Michael Larson, famous game show contestant on Press Your Luck in 1984
 Andrew McBurney, Lieutenant Governor of Ohio, 1866–1868
 John McLean, Associate Justice of the U.S. Supreme Court from 1829 to 1861
 Ormsby M. Mitchel, West Point grad, astronomer, surveyor, general from 1812 to 1825
 Marcus Mote, early Ohio artist
 Corwin M. Nixon, state representative 1962–1992, minority leader 1979-1992
 F. E. Riddle, lawyer and Oklahoma Supreme Court justice
 Gordon Ray Roberts, U.S. Army Medal of Honor recipient
 Marty Roe, lead singer of the band Diamond Rio
 Dean Roll, pro wrestler known as Shark Boy or Dean Baldwin
 Casey Shaw, NBA player with the Philadelphia 76ers
 Larry Sparks, bluegrass singer and guitarist
 Russel Wright, industrial designer and artist; responsible for wide acceptance of Modernism in America

In popular culture
The 1978 movie Harper Valley PTA with Barbara Eden and the 1994 movie Milk Money with Ed Harris and Melanie Griffith were both shot in Lebanon.

In October 2013, a Hallmark Channel movie titled The Christmas Spirit was filmed in Lebanon. In 2014, the movie Carol, starring Cate Blanchett, was partially filmed in Lebanon.

See also

 Lebanon Countryside Trail
 Warren County Canal
 Cincinnati, Lebanon and Northern Railway
 Lebanon-Warren County Airport
 Fort Ancient (Lebanon, Ohio)

References

Further reading
 Elva R. Adams. Warren County Revisited. [Lebanon, Ohio]: Warren County Historical Society, 1989.
 The Centennial Atlas of Warren County, Ohio. Lebanon, Ohio: The Centennial Atlas Association, 1903.
 John W. Hauck. Narrow Gauge in Ohio. Boulder, Colorado: Pruett Publishing, 1986. 
 Josiah Morrow. The History of Warren County, Ohio. Chicago: W.H. Beers, 1883. (Reprinted several times)
 Ohio Atlas & Gazetteer. 6th ed. Yarmouth, Maine: DeLorme, 2001. 
 William E. Smith. History of Southwestern Ohio: The Miami Valleys. New York: Lewis Historical Publishing, 1964. 3 vols.
 Warren County Engineer's Office. Official Highway Map 2003. Lebanon, Ohio: The Office, 2003.

External links

 Official site
 Lebanon Area Chamber of Commerce
 Shaker Collection From the Rare Book and Special Collection Division at the Library of Congress
 

Cities in Warren County, Ohio
County seats in Ohio
Populated places established in 1802
Cities in Ohio